Tanja Ribič (born 28 June 1968) is a Slovenian actress and singer.

Biography 
Ribič graduated from the Academy of Theatre, Radio, Film and Television in Ljubljana. She has been a member of Ljubljana City Theatre since 1992.

She represented Slovenia at Eurovision Song Contest 1997 with the song "Zbudi se", which finished tenth.

Her most noticeable role on television was when she played Magda Velepič in the Slovenian TV series Naša mala klinika.

In April 2009 Ribič and Branko Đurić acted in the movie Lunina prva noč, which was played in English language.

In 2014 she was a member of the jury in the TV show Znan obraz ima svoj glas.

Personal life

She is married to actor and director Branko Đurić. The two are often portrayed as friends of Angelina Jolie and Brad Pitt in the media.

Movie roles 
 1990, Umetni raj – dir. Karpo Godina
 1994, Halgato, as Iza
 1994–1997, Teater Paradižnik, TV series, as Marjana Velepič
 1996, Junaki petega razreda, as teacher
 2000, Nepopisan list, as Jan's mother
 2001, No Man's Land
 2002, Kajmak in Marmelada, as Špela
 2004–2007, Naša mala klinika, TV series, as Magda Velepič
 2009, Lunina prva noč
 2011, Traktor, ljubezen in rock′n′roll, as Silvija
 2012, Hvala za Sunderland, as Sabina
 2014, Dekleta ne jočejo
 2014, Atomski zdesna, as Sonja
 2014, Leaves of the tree, as nun

Theater roles 
 1999, Pygmalion, Ljubljana City Theatre, as Eliza Doolittle
 2001, Cyrano de Bergerac, Ljubljana City Theatre, as Roksana
 2007, Ljudomrznik, Ljubljana City Theatre, as Celimena
 2007, Zgodbe vsakdanje norosti, Ljubljana City Theatre, as Alice
 2008, Tri sestre, Ljubljana City Theatre, as Irina
 2008, Punce in pol, Ljubljana City Theatre, as Marlena
 2009, Osli, Ljubljana City Theatre, as Kleareta
 2011, Namišljeni bolnik, Ljubljana City Theatre, as Belina
 2012, Čarovnice iz Eastwicka, Ljubljana City Theatre, as Alexandra Spofford
 2013, Komedija z ženskami, Ljubljana City Theatre, as Hilde Prill

Discography

Albums 
 1999, Ko vse utihne – "Waken now", "Midva bi lahko" and "Moja mala dlan"
 2000, To je zdaj amore – "Roža", "100 solzic" and "Spomni se"

Songs 
 "Zbudi se" (videospot)
 "Waken now"
 "Za vsako rano" (videospot)
 "Brez tebe ne bi" (videospot)
 "Julija" (videospot)
 "Simpatija"
 "Jablana"
 "Moja mala dlan"
 "Midva bi lahko"
 "100 solzic"
 "Spomni se"
 "Roža"
 "V dolini tihi" (videospot) (duet with Pero Lovšin)
 "Mambo italiano" (videospot)
 "Sinoči sem na vasi bil" (videospot) (duet with Saša Lošić)
 "Lajanje v luno"
 "Na božični večer"
 "Novoletni objem" (videospot)

References

External links 
 

1968 births
Living people
21st-century Slovenian actresses
20th-century Slovenian women singers
People from Trbovlje
Slovenian television actresses
Eurovision Song Contest entrants for Slovenia
Eurovision Song Contest entrants of 1997
21st-century Slovenian women singers